Samuel Stephens (c. 1768 – 25 February 1834)
was a politician in Cornwall. He sat in the House of Commons of the United Kingdom in two periods between 1806 at 1820.

He served as High Sheriff of Cornwall for 1805 and then at the 1806 general election was elected as a Member of Parliament (MP) for St Ives,
where he was re-elected in 1807
and held the seat until the 1812 general election, when he did not contest St Ives.

He was re-elected for St Ives at the 1818 general election,
and held the seat until the next election, in 1820.

He was the son of a previous MP for St Ives, Samuel Stephens.

On Novembee 29, 1796, he married Betty Wallis, the daughter of Samuel Wallis and daughter of John Hearle of Penryn.

They had five children:
Samuel Wallis, his heir.
John Augustus.
Francis Hearle, a cavalry officer.
Henry Lewis, of Oriel College, Oxford, to whom he left Tregenna Castle.
Ferdinand Thomas.
Sarah-Maria (5 October 1800 – 16 June 1878). She married (6 March 1827) the Reverend Charles William Davy.

References

External links 

 

1834 deaths
High Sheriffs of Cornwall
Members of the Parliament of the United Kingdom for St Ives
UK MPs 1806–1807
UK MPs 1807–1812
UK MPs 1818–1820

Year of birth uncertain